Calvillo is a municipality in the Mexican state of Aguascalientes. The city of Calvillo, the second largest in the state, serves as the municipal seat. It is located to the western part of the state, at about 52 kilometers of the city of Aguascalientes. It is bounded by Jalisco and Zacatecas. The municipality, which has an area of 931.26 km² (359.56 sq mi), reported a population of 54,136 by 2010. The town of Ojocaliente is another significant community in the municipality. Calvillo is one of the richest, most prosperous municipalities in Aguascalientes.

During the French invasion of Mexico, the north part of the valley of Huajuacar in which Calvillo lays, was occupied by the French.  At the time, they intermixed with the descendants of Spaniards which already inhabited the south part of the valley. This fact made Calvillo the municipality with most Caucasian-origin inhabitants in the state, compared with the other municipalities.

Calvillo is the largest guava producer in Mexico and famous for its superb confectionery and liqueurs made from this fruit, which you can sample at the Guava Fair held during the first week of December.

The economy in Calvillo is centered on the guava, although there is other agriculture and a great deal of commerce.  Calvillo is better known as the world capital of the guava.

Demographics

As of 2010, the municipality had a total population of 54,136,

As of 2010, the city of Calvillo had a population of 19,742. Other than the city of Calvillo, the municipality had 307 localities, the largest of which (with 2010 populations in parentheses) were: Ojocaliente (6,914), classified as urban, and El Cuervero (Cuerveros) (2,350), Valle Huejúcar (Fraccionamiento Popular) (1,991), La Labor (1,988), Malpaso (1,697), San Tadeo (1,507), Chiquihuitero (San Isidro) (1,318), La Panadera (1,212), Mesa Grande (1,149), Jaltiche de Arriba (1,114), and Crucero las Pilas (1,031), classified as rural.

References

Link to tables of population data from Census of 2005 Instituto Nacional de Estadística, Geografía e Informática (INEGI)
Aguascalientes Enciclopedia de los Municipios de México
Spanish version of the history of Calvillo

External links
Ayuntamiento de Calvillo Official website
http://calvillo.blogspot.com
https://web.archive.org/web/20190121024015/https://calvillo.com.mx/
http://calvillo.sdmexico.com
Gobierno del Estado de Aguascalientes Official website of State of Aguascalientes
http://www.calvilloweb.com
 https://web.archive.org/web/20081121201222/http://www.livevideo.com/liveshow/calvillo
 http://www.myspace.com/calvisranch

Municipalities of Aguascalientes